Homeless Brother is the fifth studio album by American singer-songwriter Don McLean, released in 1974. It was reissued by BGO Records in 1996.

Track listing
All tracks composed by Don McLean except where indicated.

Side One
"Winter Has Me in Its Grip"
"La La Love You"
"Homeless Brother"
"Sunshine Life for Me (Sail Away Raymond)" (George Harrison)
"The Legend of Andrew McCrew"

Side Two
"Wonderful Baby"
"You Have Lived"
"Great Big Man" 
"Tangled (Like a Spider in Her Hair)"
"Crying in the Chapel" (Artie Glenn)
"Did You Know"

Chart positions

Personnel
 Don McLean - vocals, acoustic guitar, banjo
Richard Tee - keyboards
Hugh McCracken - guitars
David Spinozza - guitars
Willie Weeks - bass guitar
The Persuasions - backing vocals
 Andrew Smith - drums
 David Carey - percussion
 Arthur Jenkins, Jr. - keyboards
 Ralph MacDonald - percussion
 Yusef Lateef - flute
 Pete Seeger - backing vocals
 Willis Jackson - tenor saxophone
Charlie Fowlkes - baritone saxophone
 George Duvivier - bass
 Kenny Vance, Cissy Houston, Renelle Stafford, Ned Albright, Steven Soles, Deidre Tuck, Linda November, Joel Dorn, Helene Miles, Arlene Martell, Marlene VerPlanck, Norma Holes - backing vocals
 Gerry Teifer - whistling
William Eaton - arrangements, conductor
 Alfred Brown, Selwart Clarke, Emanuel Vardi, Sanford Allen, Joseph Malignaggi, Avram Weiss, Diana Halprin, Charles Libove, Harry Cykman, Emanuel Green, Harry Lookofsky, Matthew Raimondi, Kermit Moore, Charles McCracken, Max Ellen, Max Pollikoff, Gene Orloff, David Nadien, Kathryn Kienke, Julius Schachter, Harold Kohon, Julius Held, Guy Lumia - strings
 Joe Wilder, Garnett Brown, Wally King, James Buffington, Jonathan Dorn, Billy Slapin, Seldon Powell, George Barrow, Charles Williams, Dany Moore, Peter Gordon, Ray Alonge, George Marge, Brooks Tillotson - horns
Technical
Bob Liftin - recording and remixing engineer
Joe Ferla - additional recording
Marcote - cover painting

References

Don McLean albums
1974 albums
Albums produced by Joel Dorn
United Artists Records albums